Ostratice is a village and municipality in Partizánske District in the Trenčín Region of western Slovakia.

History
In historical records the village was first mentioned in 1439.

Geography
The municipality lies at an altitude of 187 metres and covers an area of 11.308 km². It has a population of about 802 people.

References

External links

 
http://www.statistics.sk/mosmis/eng/run.html

Villages and municipalities in Partizánske District